Sherbeen Sporting Club, is an Egyptian football club based in Sherbeen, El Dakhlia, Egypt. The club currently plays in the Egyptian Second Division, the second-highest league in the Egyptian football league system.

Egyptian Second Division
Football clubs in Egypt
Association football clubs established in 1963
1963 establishments in Egypt